The Martin Luther King Jr. Concert Series is a summer concert series held in Brooklyn at Wingate Park since the 1980s. Tons of artist have performed at this concert series including Public Enemy, Bootsy, New Edition, Heads Of State, Salt-N-Pepa, Boyz ii men, Run-DMC, and Charlie Wilson

References

Culture of Brooklyn